Dindica para is a moth of the family Geometridae first described by Charles Swinhoe in 1891. It is found in India, Malaysia and China.

Subspecies
Dindica para para C. Swinhoe, 1891 (India, China)
Dindica para malayana Inoue, 1990 (Malaysia)

References

Moths described in 1891
Pseudoterpnini